The posterior compartment of the leg is one of the fascial compartments of the leg and is divided further into deep and superficial compartments.

Structure

Muscles

Superficial posterior compartment

Deep posterior compartment

Blood supply 
Posterior tibial artery

Innervation
The posterior compartment of the leg is supplied by the tibial nerve.

Function
 It contains the plantar flexors:

Additional images

References

External links

 Diagram at patientcareonline.com

Muscles of the lower limb